Suasa is a monotypic butterfly genus in the family Lycaenidae erected by Lionel de Nicéville in 1890. Its only species, Suasa lisides, the red imperial, was first described by William Chapman Hewitson in 1863. It is a small butterfly found in India.

See also
List of butterflies of India (Lycaenidae)

References

External links
 With images.

Butterflies of Asia
Monotypic butterfly genera
Iolaini
Taxa named by Lionel de Nicéville
Lycaenidae genera